The Citrus County School District is the public school district of Citrus County, Florida. The district serves the cities of Crystal River and Inverness, and communities such as Beverly Hills, Citrus Springs, Floral City, Hernando, Holder, Homosassa, and Lecanto. The district is composed of eleven elementary schools, four middle schools, three high schools, a charter school, and two alternative schools.

Personnel
Sandra "Sam" Himmel, Superintendent
Mike Mullen, Assistant Superintendent
Jonny Bishop, Executive Director
Thomas Kennedy, School Board Member, District No. 1
Ginger Bryant, School Board Member, District No. 2
Douglas Dodd, School Board Member, District No. 3
Sandy Counts, School Board Member, District No. 4
Linda B. Powers, School Board Member, District No. 5

Schools

Elementary schools
Central Ridge Elementary
Citrus Springs Elementary
Crystal River Primary
Floral City Elementary
Forest Ridge Elementary
Hernando Elementary
Homosassa Elementary
Inverness Primary
Lecanto Primary
Pleasant Grove Elementary
Rock Crusher Elementary

Middle schools
Citrus Springs Middle School
Crystal River Middle School
Inverness Middle School
Lecanto Middle School

High schools

Citrus High School (Hurricane)
Crystal River High School (Pirate)
Lecanto High School (Panther)

Charter school
Academy of Environmental Science

Technical College
Withlacoochee Technical College

Alternative schools
CREST, Citrus Resource for Exceptional Student Transition (previously known as Lakeview)
Renaissance Center

References

School districts in Florida
Education in Citrus County, Florida